Indian Marriage may refer to:
 Indian Marriage (card game)
Marriage in India